Hattarwat is a village located in Chikodi taluka in the Belgaum District of the State of Karnataka in southern India. It is also called the green valley of Chikodi.

Geography and climate
It is 1,000 metres (3,300 feet) above sea level. The village is very cool. It never faces a water problem in summer. The climate is cool even when nearby villages face a temperature of 32 °C.

History
The founder of the village was Nasarullah Shah Wali-Allah Taalanahu. This village is famous for Hindu-Muslim Unity.

References

Villages in Belagavi district